Dacryodes expansa is a tree in the family Burseraceae. The specific epithet  is from the Latin meaning "spread out", referring to the structure of the petals.

Description
Dacryodes expansa grows as a small tree. The buds are reddish brown. The leaves consist of four leaflets.

Distribution and habitat
Dacryodes expansa is endemic to Borneo and is uncommon. Its habitat is lowland forests.

References

expansa
Endemic flora of Borneo
Trees of Borneo
Plants described in 1930
Flora of the Borneo lowland rain forests